Modern pentathlon at the 2010 Asian Games was held in Huangcun Sports Base and Aoti Aquatics Centre Guangzhou, China between 23 November and 24 November 2010.

Schedule

Medalists

Men

Women

Medal table

Participating nations
A total of 33 athletes from 6 nations competed in modern pentathlon at the 2010 Asian Games:

References

Results

External links
Official website

 
2010 Asian Games events
2010
2010 in modern pentathlon